Mexicana is a 1945 American musical film directed by Alfred Santell and starring Tito Guízar, Constance Moore and Leo Carrillo. The film was one of three made by Republic Pictures in line with the American government's Good Neighbor policy towards Latin America. Its plot is almost identical to that of another Guízar vehicle Brazil (1944).

Plot

A crooner and heartthrob in Mexico, "Pepe" Luis Almarena Villarreal (Tito Guízar), grows tired of being mobbed by his young female fans.  With the help of his manager, Esteban Guzman (Leo Carrillo) they plan to enlist the help of someone to play Villarreal's faux-wife.  Enter Alison Calvert (Constance Moore), an American star in her own right, who first declines the offer, but eventually agrees to playing the trophy wife.  Villarreal and Calvert butt heads often, and become upset over the competition from his fans.  The pretend couple hatch a plan but become aware that they both have a love of family.  Tricks and misunderstanding find Villarreal and Calvert in separate places, but both secretly admitting they love each other.  A dejected Villarreal still performs, and eventually Calvert joins him on stage during a romantic ballad.  As the sweethearts finish the number, they duck behind Villarreal's top-hat share a real kiss.

Cast
 Tito Guízar as 'Pepe' Villarreal 
 Constance Moore as Alison Calvert 
 Leo Carrillo as Esteban Guzman 
 Estelita Rodriguez as Lupita 
 Howard Freeman as Beagle 
 Steven Geray as Laredo 
 Jean Stevens as Bunny Ford  
 Bobby Barber as Bellboy 
 Maria Valadez as Chamber Maid 
 Martin Garralaga as Policeman 
 Carla Menet as Old-Fashioned Girl 
 Alma Beltran as Modern Girl 
 Craig Lawrence as Caballero

References

Bibliography
 Affron, Charles & Affron, Mirella Jona. Best Years: Going to the Movies, 1945-1946. Rutgers University Press, 2009.

External links

1945 films
American musical comedy films
American black-and-white films
1945 musical comedy films
1940s English-language films
Films directed by Alfred Santell
Films scored by Walter Scharf
Republic Pictures films
1940s American films